"Hurricane" is a single by American rock band Thrice, off of their studio album To Be Everywhere Is to Be Nowhere. It peaked at number 24 on the Billboard Mainstream Rock Songs chart in August 2017.

Background
A music video for the song was teased on April 3, 2017, and released on April 6. The song was the highest viewed new video in its debut week in April on Loudwire's Top 10 Video Countdown.

Themes and composition
The song has been described as very ominous and doom-laden. The song opens with gentle, melodic and melancholic clean guitar notes, followed by vocals by Kensrue. The verses show a calm, soothing conversation of two lovers speaking, about how to avoid an upcoming hurricane, while the chorus erupts with large, distorted guitars and intense vocals, representing the coming of the storm. Frontman Dustin Kensrue outlined the ideas and concepts explored in the song:

Despite Teppei Teranishi typically being the band's lead guitarist, Kensrue both wrote and played the song's lead guitar part in the song, something attributed to the fact that he wrote the part, and because he felt it sounds better coming from his particular guitar rig and guitar pedal setup, specifically the Electro-Harmonix POG 2.

Reception
Loudwire named it the ninth best hard rock song of 2017.

Personnel
Dustin Kensrue – lead vocals, rhythm guitar
Teppei Teranishi – lead guitar, backing vocals
Eddie Breckenridge – bass, backing vocals
Riley Breckenridge – drums

Charts

References

2017 songs
2017 singles
Thrice songs
Vagrant Records singles